Kuhi is a town and a tehsil in the Umred subdivision of the Nagpur district in Nagpur, India. Kuhi is located 40 km from Nagpur District.Kuhi is two town areas. One is Kuhi and other is Bhojapur. It comes under the revenue division of Berar region in the state of Maharashtra.

It is located along the banks of the Nag River.

Demographics 
AS per Indian government census of 2011, the population was 1,23,977.

References

as a citizen of Nagpur...
Cities and towns in Nagpur district
Talukas in Maharashtra